Markus Haider is an Austrian singer part of The Gang Guys, who dub themselves "the Austrian Rat Pack", a tribute band to the original Rat Pack. He is most famous for a popular performance of Dean Martin's Sway that is commonly but mistakenly thought to be performed by Frank Sinatra.

The popular cover of Sway performed by Haider was part of a relatively recent tribute show to the Rat Pack performed at Entropolos Theatre, it is believed that the date of the performance is somewhere around 2009 but the location of the performance is still unknown. The black-and-white hue of the video was later added to the video by Niki Lappas - the band's editor - giving the performance a more dated look, resulting in confusion as to the date of the performance and the identity of the performer is, with many uploaders mistakenly labelling it a Frank Sinatra performance, despite there being no known Sinatra performance of the song. The cacophonous, adorating audience featured in the video was spliced from a Beatles performance on February 9, 1964.

Markus Haider alias Schlager singer Michael Mende 

In 2011 Markus Haider tried a Schlager project and released a CD titled "Auftritt". His Artist Name in this project was called Michael Mende. Even though the CD was not ready produced by that date, his producer Johnny Matrix submitted a track called "Bella scusami" to the Alpen Grand Prix in Italy, in which he won 2nd place.
This track also was 8 weeks on Belgian National Radio (brf2)  Schlager-Charts with highest ranking on #19.

Markus Haider as an actor 

Markus Haider also appears as an actor in a few movies. Nicolas Neuhold is director of the short film „Würstelstand“ and a close fried to Haider. Together the made a project „Cannes - through the eyes of the hunter“, which was Neuholds students final assignment. This short film was nominated for the Students Television Awards 2000 by the Royal Television Society.

References

External links
 The Gang Guys' official website
 
 
 
 The Royal Television Society Nominees 2000
 Radio BRF2 with Charts from 18 December 2011
 Winner of Alpen Grand Prix 2011
 Newspaper Article about Semifinals in Lienz
 Michael Mende live at Alpen Grand Prix with "Bella scusami"
 Markus Haider sings "Love" with Guther Frank in a Promovideo for a Show
 Newspaper reports on the successful show with the Gorzow Philharmonic Orchestra in Poland 7 January 2016

Living people
21st-century Austrian male singers
Austrian pop singers
Traditional pop music singers
1974 births